Saints-Geosmes is a commune in the Haute-Marne department in north-eastern France. On 1 January 2016, the former commune Balesmes-sur-Marne was merged into Saints-Geosmes.

See also
Communes of the Haute-Marne department

References

Saintsgeosmes